Fonuaika is an island in Lulunga district, in the Ha'apai islands of Tonga.

References

Islands of Tonga
Haʻapai